Yuriy Bukel (born 30 November 1971) is a former Ukrainian footballer and coach.

References

External links 
 
 Profile at Odeskiy futbol portal
 

1971 births
Living people
Footballers from Odesa
Soviet footballers
Ukrainian footballers
Ukraine international footballers
FC Chornomorets Odesa players
FC Chornomorets-2 Odesa players
FC Mariupol players
FC Shakhtar Makiivka players
FC Sheriff Tiraspol players
FC Tiraspol players
FC Ivan Odesa players
FC Palmira Odesa players
FC Hirnyk Kryvyi Rih players
Soviet Top League players
Ukrainian Premier League players
Ukrainian football managers
FC Oleksandriya managers
Ukrainian expatriate footballers
Expatriate footballers in Moldova
Ukrainian expatriate sportspeople in Moldova
Association football defenders